Alfred "Al" Runte (April 16, 1947) is an environmental historian and former college educator from Seattle who ran for mayor of Seattle in 2005.

Background
Runte was born on April 16, 1947, in Binghamton, New York, where he graduated from North High School in 1965 and the State University of New York at Binghamton in 1969. He also holds an M.A. from Illinois State University (1971) and a Ph.D. in history from the University of California, Santa Barbara (1976). Runte has taught at five institutions of higher learning, including Baylor University and the University of Washington. Runte's work focuses on parks, conservation, and public transportation. His first book, National Parks: The American Experience (1979) is a study of the national park idea. Runte has also completed a history of railroads and the environment: Allies of the Earth: Railroads and the Soul of Preservation. He advised Ken Burns on the PBS series on the U.S. national parks.

2005 Mayoral campaign
In 2005 Runte ran for Seattle mayor, achieving second place amid a field of seven candidates in the September primary election, and finally losing to incumbent Greg Nickels in the general election.

Post-election
Since the election, Runte has remained a popular figure among the neighborhood parks and environmental interests in Seattle. He spoke before a crowd of diverse neighborhood groups in early 2006 which marched on Woodland Park Zoo to protest the mayor's plans to build a parking garage in the middle of a city park.

2007 City Council campaign
Runte ran for Position 3 on the Seattle City Council, formerly held by Peter Steinbrueck. Runte previously applied to fill Position 9 after it was made vacant in 2006, now held by Sally Clark.

Books by Al Runte
 Burlington Northern and the Dedication of Mount St. Helens: New Legacy of a Proud Tradition. 1982.
 Public Lands, Public Heritage: The National Forest Idea. 1991. 
 Yosemite: The Embattled Wilderness. 1993. 
  National Parks: The American Experience. 1997. 
 Trains of Discovery: Western Railroads and the National Parks. 1998. 
 Allies of the Earth: Railroads And the Soul of Preservation. 2006.

External links
Al Runte Seattle City Council campaign site
 Denied Tenure in '85, former UW professor fights on, The Seattle Times, July 24, 2004
Al Runte For Mayor
King County Voters' Guide on Al Runte
Al Runte bio at Center for the Study of the Environment
Alfred Runte: Denied Tenure, Chronicle of Higher Education via History News Network
The Disgruntled Professor, The Stranger, October 20, 2005
Runte's campaign under the radar, Seattle Times, November 1, 2005
One more may join mayoral race, Seattle Post-Intelligencer, July 23, 2005
A 3-minute campaign for City Council, Seattle Post-Intelligencer, January 13, 2006
Runte seeks Steinbrueck's Seattle City Council seat, Seattle Post-Intelligencer (Strange Bedfellows blog), May 16, 2007
, King County Records and Elections
Clark sworn in as newest City Council member, Seattle Post-Intelligencer, February 7, 2006

1947 births
Living people
Politicians from Seattle
University of Washington faculty
Binghamton University alumni
Illinois State University alumni
University of California, Santa Barbara alumni